Hariotina is a genus of green algae in the family Scenedesmaceae.

The genus name of Hariotina is in honour of Paul Auguste Joseph Valentin Hariot (1854-1917), who was a French naturalist, botanist (Bryology,
and Algology) and apothecary. In 1882, he worked in the Cryptogam department of the National Museum of Natural History, France in Paris.

The genus was circumscribed by Pierre Clément Augustin Dangeard in Botaniste vol.1 on page 162 in 1889.

References

External links

Sphaeropleales genera
Sphaeropleales